Is It Clear, My Friend? (Je li jasno, prijatelju?) is a Croatian film directed by Dejan Aćimović. It was released in 2000.

External links
 

2000 films
2000s Croatian-language films
2000s prison films
Croatian drama films
Films scored by Goran Bregović
Films set in the 1980s
2000 directorial debut films
2000 drama films